Bréhima Coulibaly is a Malian diplomat and is the current Ambassador of Mali to Russia, presenting his credentials to Russian President Dmitry Medvedev on 16 January 2009.

References

Living people
Ambassadors of Mali to Russia
Ambassadors of Mali to Ukraine
Malian diplomats
Year of birth missing (living people)
21st-century Malian people